The 2012 Canadian Mixed Curling Championship was held from November 12 to 19, 2011, at the Sudbury Curling Club in Sudbury, Ontario.

Teams
The teams are as follows:

Round-robin standings
Final round-robin standings

Round-robin results
All draw times are listed in Eastern Standard Time (UTC-05).

Draw 1
Saturday, November 12, 10:00

Draw 2
Saturday, November 12, 14:30

Draw 3
Saturday, November 12, 19:00

Draw 4
Sunday, November 13, 10:00

Draw 5
Sunday, November 13, 14:30

Draw 6
Sunday, November 13, 19:00

Draw 7
Monday, November 14, 10:00

Draw 8
Monday, November 14, 14:30

Draw 9
Monday, November 14, 19:00

Draw 10
Tuesday, November 15, 10:00

Draw 11
Tuesday, November 15, 14:30

Draw 12
Tuesday, November 15, 19:00

Draw 13
Wednesday, November 16, 10:00

Draw 14
Wednesday, November 16, 14:30

Draw 15
Wednesday, November 16, 19:00

Draw 16
Thursday, November 17, 10:00

Draw 17
Thursday, November 17, 14:30

Draw 18
Thursday, November 17, 19:00

Draw 19
Friday, November 18, 9:00

Playoffs

Semifinal
Friday, November 18, 19:00

Final
Saturday, November 19, 13:30

References

External links
Home Page

Mixed Curling Championship
Curling competitions in Greater Sudbury
2011 in Ontario
Canadian Mixed Curling Championship
Mixed Curling Championship